Virginia's 70th House of Delegates district elects one of 100 seats in the Virginia House of Delegates, the lower house of the state's bicameral legislature. District 70, in Henrico County, Chesterfield County, and Richmond, Virginia, has been represented by Democrat Delores McQuinn since 2010. In the 2017 election, she faced a primary challenge from Alex Mejias.

District officeholders

References

External links
 

Virginia House of Delegates districts
Government in Henrico County, Virginia
Government in Chesterfield County, Virginia
Richmond, Virginia